Chalcosyrphus (Xylotomima) anomalus  (Shannon, 1925)  the Long-tailed Leafwalker, is a rare species of syrphid fly found in Eastern Canada and the Northeastern United States. Hoverflies can remain nearly motionless while in flight. The adults are also known as flower flies for they are commonly found around and on flowers, from which they get both energy-giving nectar and protein-rich pollen.

Distribution
Canada, United States.

References

Eristalinae
Insects described in 1925
Diptera of North America
Hoverflies of North America
Taxa named by Raymond Corbett Shannon